Folk Radio UK, is an online Independent Music Journal covering a broad range of Folk music, Global music, Independent music, American Primitive Guitar, Drone Music and other alternative offerings. Established in 2004 by Alex Gallacher. the website features Album Reviews,  News, Live Reviews and Interviews. They are based in Somerset, but supported by a team of reviewers and journalists that include Robin Denselow. 

Articles are supplemented by mixes and shows. These include the Folk Show; a more "leftfield and alternative" Lost in Transmission series, and the experimental KLOF series.

A specialist folk music channel was launched on Deezer in 2012 which was curated by Folk Radio UK's Editor.

References

External links
 Official website

2004 establishments in England

Americana in the United Kingdom
Americana radio stations
Folk music mass media
Mass media in Somerset
Online magazines published in the United Kingdom
Radio stations in Somerset
Traditional music